Cochabamba is represented in the Plurinational Legislative Assembly of Bolivia by four senators and their alternates elected through proportional representation. They serve five-year terms and qualify for reelection indefinitely. The current delegation comprises three senators from the Movement for Socialism (MAS-IPSP) and one from Civic Community (CC): Leonardo Loza, Patricia Arce, Andrónico Rodríguez, and Andrea Barrientos. Their respective alternates are: Lucy Escobar, Hermo Pérez, Dilma Cabrera, and Guillermo Seoane. Although the bicameral system was adopted in the 1831 Constitution and was maintained in subsequently promulgated constitutions, it can be affirmed that with the exception of very small intervals, the Senate did not, in fact, exercise its functions until the convocation of the 1882 legislature. Furthermore, due to heavy political instability and frequent military interventions since 1882, Bolivia did not experience a continuous, uninterrupted legislative session until 1982.

List of senators

References

Notes

Footnotes

Bibliography 

 
 

 
Cochabamba